Sipri may refer to:

As-Safira, a city in Syria, known in pre-Islamic times as Sipri
Shivpuri, a city and a municipality in Madhya Pradesh, India, formerly known as Sipri
Stockholm International Peace Research Institute (SIPRI)

See also
CPRI (disambiguation)